Amsacta latimarginalis is a moth of the  family Erebidae. It was described by Rothschild in 1933. It is found in the Central African Republic, Ghana, Malawi, Nigeria, Sierra Leone and Sudan.

Subspecies
Amsacta latimarginalis latimarginalis (Central African Republic, Sudan)
Amsacta latimarginalis elongata Rothschild, 1933  (Malawi)

References

Moths described in 1933
Spilosomina
Moths of Sub-Saharan Africa
Lepidoptera of West Africa
Insects of the Central African Republic
Lepidoptera of Malawi
Lepidoptera of Sudan